Touton giant cells are a type of multinucleated giant cell seen in lesions with high lipid content such as fat necrosis, xanthoma, and xanthelasma and  xanthogranulomas. They are also found in dermatofibroma.

History
Touton giant cells are named for Karl Touton, a German botanist and dermatologist. Karl Touton first observed these cells in 1885 and named them "xanthelasmatic giant cells", a name which has since fallen out of favor.

Appearance
Touton giant cells, being multinucleated giant cells, can be distinguished by the presence of several nuclei in a distinct pattern. They contain a ring of nuclei surrounding a central homogeneous cytoplasm, while foamy cytoplasm surrounds the nuclei. The cytoplasm surrounded by the nuclei has been described as both amphophilic and eosinophilic, while the cytoplasm near the periphery of the cell is pale and foamy in appearance.

Causes
Touton giant cells are formed by the fusion of macrophage-derived foam cells. It has been suggested that cytokines such as interferon gamma, interleukin-3, and M-CSF may be involved in the production of Touton giant cells.

References

External links
 Cytokines & Cells Online Pathfinder Encyclopaedia

Cell biology